Westergaardites is an Upper Cambrian trilobite that is known from the Eastern Tian Shan (Central Asia). It is related to Triarthrus, but can easily be distinguished from it by an extremely long exoskeleton, anteriorly placed eyes, a thorax of 19 segments with an extremely wide axis, and very narrow pleural regions, pleural spines, and a pygidium with marginal spines.

References 

Olenina
Ptychopariida genera
Cambrian trilobites of Asia

Cambrian genus extinctions